Gábor Mayer (born 22 January 1959) is a Hungarian skier. He competed at the 1984 Winter Olympics, the 1988 Winter Olympics and the 1992 Winter Olympics.

References

External links
 

1959 births
Living people
Hungarian male biathletes
Hungarian male cross-country skiers
Olympic biathletes of Hungary
Olympic cross-country skiers of Hungary
Biathletes at the 1984 Winter Olympics
Biathletes at the 1992 Winter Olympics
Cross-country skiers at the 1988 Winter Olympics
Skiers from Budapest
20th-century Hungarian people